Skeletonemataceae is a family of diatoms in the order Thalassiosirales. There is currently only one known genus in this family of diatoms known as Skeletonema as reported from diatom.org. Being from the Thalassiosirales order means that Skeletonemataceae are centric diatoms.

The sexual reproduction of oogamous is where reproduction occurs by the union of mobile male and immobile female gametes. This way of reproduction is possible due to the lack of significant motility which is also a defining trait of Skeletonema.

References

Thalassiosirales
Diatom families